Roman Andriyovych Volokhatyi (born 23 August 2000) is a Ukrainian professional footballer who plays as a central midfielder for Ukrainian club Nyva Ternopil.

References

External links
 
 

2000 births
Living people
Ukrainian footballers
Association football midfielders
FC Krystal Chortkiv players
FC Nyva Ternopil players
Ukrainian First League players
Ukrainian Second League players
Ukrainian Amateur Football Championship players
Sportspeople from Ternopil Oblast